The Samsung NX 16mm F2.4 Pancake is an interchangeable camera lens announced by Samsung on February 21, 2011.

See also
Pancake lens

References
http://www.dpreview.com/products/samsung/lenses/samsung_16_2p4/specifications

16
Pancake lenses
Camera lenses introduced in 2011